Vechigen is a municipality in the Bern-Mittelland administrative district in the canton of Bern in Switzerland. Until the administrative centralization of 1966 it was made up of four semi-autonomous communities; Vechigen, Sinneringen with Boll and Dentenberg, Utzigen with Lindental and Berg with Littewil and Radelfingen.

History
Vechigen is first mentioned in 1275 as Vechingen. Sinneringen was first mentioned in 1261-63 as Sineringen. Utzigen was called Uzingen in 1275.

Vechigen
The Vechigen valley and mountain originally belonged to the Baron of Belp-Montenach. However, in 1298, they lost their land to the growing city of Bern. From then on, Vechigen was one of the four outer parishes of Bern and until 1798 residents of the village were also citizens of the city.

The village church of St. Martin was first mentioned in 1275. It was rebuilt in 1513/14, the bell tower dates from 1486.

In 1834 the municipality of Vechigen was formed with four quarters. The quarters were Vechigen, Sinneringen with Boll and Dentenberg, Utzigen with Lindental and Berg with Littewil and Radelfingen. Each quarter was responsible for local administration including schooling and road construction, while the municipality handled taxation and finance. In 1913 the Worblentalbahn opened a rail station in Boll-Utzigen. By 1950, the agglomeration of Bern had spread out along this line and the villages of Boll and Sinneringen became part of agglomeration area. The population grew rapidly in these two villages while it dropped or stagnated in the rest of the municipality. As the quarters changed from agricultural into residential, the decentralized government became inefficient and in 1966 it was centralized into a single government. In 1961 a secondary school was built in the municipality and there are now a total of five school buildings.

Sinneringen and Boll
Until 1966, the Sinneringen quarter included Sinneringen, the hamlets Boll and Dentenberg as well as farm houses in the Worblen valley and on the Dentenberg mountain. On the hillside above the Worblen, several Hallstatt graves were discovered. A Roman villa was found on at Hubel. During the 13th century, the Counts of Kyburg were the vogts over the village. In 1729, Hans Rudolf von Diesbach built his country estate, the Schlössli, in Sinneringen. In 1844, the artist August von Bonstetten expanded the manor house and added a clock tower.

By the 1950s it was part of the agglomeration of Bern and the population increased rapidly. By 2005 over half of the population in Vechigen lives in Sinneringen and Boll.

Boll developed from shops and inns at the intersection of the Bern-Krauchthal and Worb-Zollikofen roads. In the 18th-19th century it consisted of a customs station, an inn, a smithy, a saw mill and some houses. During the 19th and 20th centuries the nearby rivers were corrected and the local swamps drained. This opened up new land around Boll for housing and farms. Despite the 19th century road construction and the completion of the Worblentalbahn rail station at Utzigen-Boll in 1913, it remained a small village. However, during the 1960s the outskirts of Bern reached Boll and village expanded rapidly. The majority of the residents of Boll commute into Bern for work.

Utzigen
The Utzigen quarter included the village of Utzigen, the hamlets of Wuhl, Birchi and Lindental and 50 single houses on a hillside above the Worblental. Utzigen grew out of a Late Medieval herrschaft. Starting in the 14th century it was owned by a number of Bernese patrician families. The herrschaft was administered from Utzigen Castle. In 1669, Samuel Jenner (1624–99) built a new castle on the site of the earlier building. After the 1798 French invasion, the herrschaft was dissolved. The owners in 1798, the Dachselhofer family, lost their rights to hold the low court over the herrschaft, but they were able to retain the castle and other property. The castle became the summer residence of that family until 1875 it was sold to the municipality. The municipality established an institute for alcoholics and unemployed man and women. At its peak the institute housed over 500 people, who worked on the large farm attached to the estate. In 1964 it was converted into a nursing and retirement home and in 2001 it became a residential care home. The village has a primary school.

Geography

The small town lies away from the principal roads of the region and is one of the more picturesque towns of the area.

Of this area,  or 60.7% is used for agricultural purposes, while  or 30.4% is forested. Of the rest of the land,  or 8.5% is settled (buildings or roads),  or 0.2% is either rivers or lakes.

Of the built up area, housing and buildings made up 5.6% and transportation infrastructure made up 2.6%. Out of the forested land, 29.2% of the total land area is heavily forested and 1.2% is covered with orchards or small clusters of trees. Of the agricultural land, 35.6% is used for growing crops and 23.1% is pastures, while 2.0% is used for orchards or vine crops. All the water in the municipality is flowing water.

The municipality is located in the upper Worblental (Worblen valley). It consists of the villages of Vechigen, Sinneringen and Boll in the valley, Utzigen on the mountain slopes and a number of scattered hamlets and farm houses including; Lindental, Littewil, Radelfingen and Dentenberg.

On 31 December 2009 Amtsbezirk Bern, the municipality's former district, was dissolved. On the following day, 1 January 2010, it joined the newly created Verwaltungskreis Bern-Mittelland.

Coat of arms
The blazon of the municipal coat of arms is Gules a Wing Argent.

Demographics
, 6.8% of the population are resident foreign nationals. Over the last 10 years (2000-2010) the population has changed at a rate of 4.4%. Migration accounted for 3.8%, while births and deaths accounted for 0.6%.

Most of the population speaks German (4,415 or 95.7%) as their first language, French is the second most common (42 or 0.9%) and English is the third (40 or 0.9%). There are 21 people who speak Italian and 1 person who speaks Romansh.

, the population was 49.1% male and 50.9% female. The population was made up of 2,091 Swiss men (45.4% of the population) and 170 (3.7%) non-Swiss men. There were 2,205 Swiss women (47.9%) and 142 (3.1%) non-Swiss women. Of the population in the municipality, 1,287 or about 27.9% were born in Vechigen and lived there in 2000. There were 2,105 or 45.6% who were born in the same canton, while 692 or 15.0% were born somewhere else in Switzerland, and 359 or 7.8% were born outside of Switzerland.

, children and teenagers (0–19 years old) make up 21.2% of the population, while adults (20–64 years old) make up 59.1% and seniors (over 64 years old) make up 19.7%.

, there were 1,830 people who were single and never married in the municipality. There were 2,330 married individuals, 265 widows or widowers and 189 individuals who are divorced.

, there were 466 households that consist of only one person and 118 households with five or more people. , a total of 1,721 apartments (89.7% of the total) were permanently occupied, while 164 apartments (8.6%) were seasonally occupied and 33 apartments (1.7%) were empty. , the construction rate of new housing units was 13.9 new units per 1000 residents. The vacancy rate for the municipality, was 0.27%.

The historical population is given in the following chart:

Sights
The entire hamlet of Lindental is designated as part of the Inventory of Swiss Heritage Sites.

Politics
In the 2011 federal election the most popular party was the SVP which received 29.5% of the vote. The next three most popular parties were the BDP Party (17.3%), the SPS (16.6%) and the FDP (9.8%). In the federal election, a total of 2,237 votes were cast, and the voter turnout was 62.0%.

Economy
, Vechigen had an unemployment rate of 1.01%. , there were a total of 1,159 people employed in the municipality. Of these, there were 299 people employed in the primary economic sector and about 105 businesses involved in this sector. 166 people were employed in the secondary sector and there were 37 businesses in this sector. 694 people were employed in the tertiary sector, with 94 businesses in this sector.

 there were a total of 837 full-time equivalent jobs. The number of jobs in the primary sector was 178, of which 176 were in agriculture and 2 were in forestry or lumber production. The number of jobs in the secondary sector was 148 of which 51 or (34.5%) were in manufacturing and 90 (60.8%) were in construction. The number of jobs in the tertiary sector was 511. In the tertiary sector; 85 or 16.6% were in wholesale or retail sales or the repair of motor vehicles, 11 or 2.2% were in the movement and storage of goods, 36 or 7.0% were in a hotel or restaurant, 6 or 1.2% were in the information industry, 43 or 8.4% were technical professionals or scientists, 74 or 14.5% were in education and 190 or 37.2% were in health care.

, there were 402 workers who commuted into the municipality and 1,654 workers who commuted away. The municipality is a net exporter of workers, with about 4.1 workers leaving the municipality for every one entering. Of the working population, 27.1% used public transportation to get to work, and 48.5% used a private car.

Religion
Of the rest of the population, there were 19 members of an Orthodox church (or about 0.41% of the population), there were 3 individuals (or about 0.07% of the population) who belonged to the Christian Catholic Church, and there were 265 individuals (or about 5.74% of the population) who belonged to another Christian church. There was 1 individual who was Jewish, and 45 (or about 0.98% of the population) who were Islamic. There were 5 individuals who were Buddhist, 27 individuals who were Hindu and 5 individuals who belonged to another church. 306 (or about 6.63% of the population) belonged to no church, are agnostic or atheist, and 143 individuals (or about 3.10% of the population) did not answer the question.

Education
In Vechigen about 1,832 or (39.7%) of the population have completed non-mandatory upper secondary education, and 817 or (17.7%) have completed additional higher education (either university or a Fachhochschule). Of the 817 who completed tertiary schooling, 70.3% were Swiss men, 22.9% were Swiss women, 4.4% were non-Swiss men and 2.4% were non-Swiss women.

The Canton of Bern school system provides one year of non-obligatory Kindergarten, followed by six years of Primary school. This is followed by three years of obligatory lower Secondary school where the students are separated according to ability and aptitude. Following the lower Secondary students may attend additional schooling or they may enter an apprenticeship.

During the 2009-10 school year, there were a total of 482 students attending classes in Vechigen. There were 4 kindergarten classes with a total of 62 students in the municipality. Of the kindergarten students, 4.8% were permanent or temporary residents of Switzerland (not citizens) and 3.2% have a different mother language than the classroom language. The municipality had 16 primary classes and 296 students. Of the primary students, 6.1% were permanent or temporary residents of Switzerland (not citizens). During the same year, there were 8 lower secondary classes with a total of 124 students. There were 7.3% who were permanent or temporary residents of Switzerland (not citizens) and 2.4% have a different mother language than the classroom language.

, there were 19 students in Vechigen who came from another municipality, while 209 residents attended schools outside the municipality.

References

Municipalities of the canton of Bern